Lisa Adaline Donovan (born February 3, 1971), known professionally as Elisa Donovan, is an American actress. She played the role of Amber Mariens in the 1995 teen comedy film Clueless, and reprised her role in the TV series of the same name (1996-1999). Donovan went on to play the role of Morgan Cavanaugh in the sitcom Sabrina the Teenage Witch (2000–2003).

Elisa's book, Wake Me When You Leave, will be released in June 2021 by Authoritize Ltd.

Early life
Elisa was born Lisa Adaline Donovan in Poughkeepsie, New York, the daughter of Charlotte and Jack Donovan, who was a business executive.

Career
Donovan's breakthrough role was in the 1995 film Clueless as Amber, Cher's nemesis. Donovan also reprised her role in the television series of the same name. Other notable roles included the film A Night at the Roxbury, Beverly Hills, 90210 as Ginger LaMonica and playing Morgan Cavanaugh on the television sitcom Sabrina, the Teenage Witch. She also played Sharona on Disney Channel's Sonny with a Chance, and has appeared in the films Complacent, The Dog Who Saved Christmas, and its sequel The Dog Who Saved the Holidays. Donovan starred in the web series, The Lake on TheWB.com. Additionally, Donovan played Gayle, an insurance agent in the small town of Maple Grove, in the web series In Gayle We Trust on NBC.com.
 
Donovan had a role in the film A Golden Christmas, where she played Anna, the sister of the main character and she played the lead role in "The 12 Wishes of Christmas."

In 2006 she played a guest role in the NCIS episode "Dead and Unburied".

She was also featured in 'N Sync's 1999 music video for "Thinking of You (I Drive Myself Crazy)" as the love interest for Joey Fatone.

She competes on the twenty-fourth season of Worst Cooks in America, the show's seventh celebrity edition titled Thats So 90s, airing in April and May 2022.

Personal life

Donovan has been married to her husband Charlie Bigelow since October 13, 2012. They have a daughter, Scarlett Avery Bigelow.

Filmography

Film

Television

References

External links

 Elisa Donovan's Blog
 
 
 

20th-century American actresses
21st-century American actresses
Actresses from New York (state)
American film actresses
American television actresses
Living people
Writers from Poughkeepsie, New York
Television producers from New York City
American women television producers
1971 births